Tamarine Tanasugarn was the defending champion, but lost to Angelique Kerber in the quarterfinals.

No.2 seed Marion Bartoli won the 2011 title, defeating No.1 seed and US Open Champion Samantha Stosur 6–3, 6–1.

Seeds

Qualifying

Main draw

Finals

Top half

Bottom half

References
Main Draw

Hp Open - Singles
2011 HP Open